Giovanni de Manna (died 1504) was a Roman Catholic prelate who served as Bishop of Lavello (1502–1504).

Biography
On 24 August 1502, Giovanni de Manna was appointed by Pope Alexander VI as Bishop of Lavello.
He served as Bishop of Lavello until his death in 1504.

References

External links and additional sources
 (Chronology of Bishops) 
 (Chronology of Bishops) 

16th-century Italian Roman Catholic bishops
1504 deaths
Bishops appointed by Pope Alexander VI